Wismer is a toponymic surname derived from the German town of Wismar. In English, the name of the city is pronounced w'iz mer.

An alternative derivation for some people with the surname is drift from the name Wiseman (Ƿyseman, Ƿysman, Ƿisman), which derived from the Old English words ƿis, meaning wise or knowledgeable, and man, meaning man. The Wiseman family in England is first found in Essex where they were anciently seated.  Some of the first settlers of this name or some of its variants were: Henry and Catherine Wiseman, who settled in Maryland in 1634; John Wiseman, who settled in Virginia in 1652; Henry Wiseman, who settled in Maryland in 1719.

People named Wismer

Donald Wismer, a science fiction novelist
Harry Wismer, a broadcaster
Susan Wismer, a politician

Surnames
Surnames of Old English origin